JC International Airlines Co., Ltd. was an airline based at Phnom Penh International Airport in Cambodia. Founded in 2014, the airline launched operations in March 2017.

JC International Airlines is a Cambodian airline. It was founded in Phnom Penh with registered capital of 50 million US dollars. The total investment will be 1 billion US dollars. JC (Cambodia) International Airlines received Initial Principal Approval from the Royal Government of Cambodia on 14 October 2014. On 17 March 2017, JC launched its inaugural service.On February 2023 JC suspended there flight and most likely to ceased operation since the airline is in "Bankrupt".

Destinations
JC International Airlines serves the following destinations:

Fleet

As of August 2019, the JC International Airlines fleet consists of the following aircraft:

See also
 List of airlines of Cambodia
 Transport in Cambodia

References

External links

Airlines established in 2014
Airlines of Cambodia
Cambodian companies established in 2014